Luigi Maria Burruano (20 October 1948 – 10 September 2017 in Palermo) was an Italian film, stage and television actor.  He began his career in Sicilian-language cabaret and theatre before turning his attention to films.

Life and career 
Born in Palermo, the son of a doctor, Burruano made his acting debut in a local amateur company. He got a large local success playing  Rancu Tanu in the comedy play Palermo oh cara and got his national breakout appearing in the eight season of the TV-series La piovra. 

A follower of the Stanislavski's system, he was specialized in playing Sicilian working-class characters.  In 2001 he was nominated for Nastro d'Argento for best supporting actor thanks to his performance in Marco Tullio Giordana's One Hundred Steps. For his performance in The Return of Cagliostro and in Break Free he received a special mention from the Pasinetti Award jury at the 2003 Venice Film Festival. In 2006 he was arrested on charges of stabbing his daughter's divorced husband, who did not pay alimony to his daughter nor pay child support. 

Burruano died after a long illness on 10 September 2017, at the age of 68. He was the uncle of actor Luigi Lo Cascio.

Roles

Stage
Plays in which Burruano appeared include:
I giganti della montagna
Coriolano
La saga del signore della nave
Il giardino di inverno
La coltellata
Pulcinella
Studio per una finestra
Ohi Bambulè!
L'aquila deve volare
Rudens
Sticus
Palermo, oh cara

Filmography

 L'amore coniugale (1970, directed by Dacia Maraini)
 Pizza Connection (1985, directed by Damiano Damiani) - Detective
 ZEN - Zona Espansione Nord (1988, directed by Gian Vittorio Baldi) - Totò
 Forever Mery (1989, directed by Marco Risi) - Cliente Mery
 Boys on the Outside (1990, directed by Marco Risi) - Franco D'Annino
 Acla's Descent into Floristella (1992, directed by Aurelio Grimaldi) - Il padre di Aclà
 The Escort (1993, directed by Ricky Tognazzi) - Informer
 Quattro bravi ragazzi (1993, directed by Claudio Camarca) - Renè's Father
 Nel continente nero (1993, directed by Marco Risi) - Domenico Spatola
 The Whores (1994, directed by Aurelio Grimaldi) - Mario
 S.P.Q.R.: 2,000 and a Half Years Ago (1994, directed by Carlo Vanzina) - Varrone
 The Star Maker (1995, directed by Giuseppe Tornatore) - Flirtatious Client
 Italiani (1996, directed by Maurizio Ponzi) - Rosario
 Luna e l'altra (1996, directed by Maurizio Nichetti) - Director
 Il figlio di Bakunin (1997, directed by Gianfranco Cabiddu) - Corbo
 La fame e la sete (1999, directed by Antonio Albanese) - Zu Alfiu
 Amore a prima vista (1999, directed by Vincenzo Salemme) - Don Antonio
 Oltremare (1999, directed by Nello Correale)
 One Hundred Steps (2000, directed by Marco Tullio Giordana) - Luigi Impastato
 E adesso sesso (2001, directed by Carlo Vanzina) (with the name of Luigi Burruano) - Barone
 Gasoline (2001, directed by Monica Stambrini) - Padre Gabriele
 Nowhere (2002, directed by Luis Sepúlveda) - Salomon Goldman
 Nati stanchi (2002, directed by Dominick Tambasco) - Don Ciccio
 Ginostra (2002, directed by Manuel Pradal) - Ettore's Uncle
 Il trasformista (2002, directed by Luca Barbareschi) - Battani
 Cuore scatenato (2003, directed by  Gianluca Sodaro) - Santo Cimino
 Break Free (2003, directed by Gianluca Maria Tavarelli) - Cenzo
 The Return of Cagliostro (2003, directed by Daniele Ciprì e Franco Maresco) - Carmelo La Marca
 Te lo leggo negli occhi (2004, directed by Valia Santella) - Carlo
 Concorso di colpa (2004, directed by Claudio Fragasso) - Ispettore Di Nunzio
 Miracle in Palermo! (2005, directed by Beppe Cino) - Fofò
 Quo Vadis, Baby? (2005, directed by Gabriele Salvatores) - Il capitano
 ...e se domani (2005, directed by Giovanni La Parola) - Commissario
 Tre giorni d'anarchia (2005, directed by Vito Zagarrio) - Don Mimmo
 Really SSSupercool: Chapter Two (2006, directed by Carlo Vanzina) - Don Calogero Calì
 Baciami piccina (2006, directed by Roberto Cimpanelli) - Mafioso in carcere
 La fine del mare (2007, directed by Nora Hoppe) - Aurelio
 Milano-Palermo: il ritorno (2007, directed by Claudio Fragasso) - Giudice Conti
 ''Blood of the Losers (2008, directed by Michele Soavi) - Mario Vagagini
 Baarìa (2009, directed by Giuseppe Tornatore) - Chemist
 Napoli, Napoli, Napoli (2009, directed by Abel Ferrara) - Comandante
 Pochi giorni per capire (2009, directed by Carlo Fusco)
 Le ultime 56 ore (2010, directed by Claudio Fragasso) - Avallone
 Qualunquemente (2011, directed by Giulio Manfredonia) - Imprenditore
 In questa vita (2011, Short, directed by Eitan Pitigliani) - Nino
 Il viaggio di Malombra (2012, directed by Rino Marino)
 Vespro d'un rinnegato (2012, directed by Carlo Fusco) - Don Cimino
 The Ideal City (2012, directed by Luigi Lo Cascio) - Avv. Scalici
 Pagate fratelli (2012, directed by Salvo Bonaffini)
 Tutto tutto niente niente (2012, directed by Giulio Manfredonia) - Imprenditore
 La madre (2013, directed by Angelo Maresca) - Don Quirico
 The Wait (2016, directed by Emil Langballe) - Vincent Cavallo
 Quel bravo ragazzo (2016, directed by Enrico Lando) - Don Ferdinando Cosimato

Television
 La piovra (1997, directed by Giacomo Battiato)
 Sotto la luna (1998, TV Movie, directed by Franco Bernini) - Renato Cianchi
 Oltremare - Non è l'America (1998, directed by Nello Correale)
 Turbo (1999, directed by Antonio Bonifacio) - commissario di Polizia Lamberti
 Il commissario Montalbano (2001) - Giacomo Larussa
 L'attentatuni (2001, TV Movie, directed by Claudio Bonivento) - Leoluca Barone
 Salvo D'Acquisto (2003, TV Movie, directed by Alberto Sironi) - Maggiore Spada
 Il maresciallo Rocca (2003) - Michele Garrone
 Camera Café (2003, TV Series)
 Paolo Borsellino (2004, TV Movie, directed by Gianluca Maria Tavarelli) - Tommaso Buscetta
 Mio figlio (2005, directed by Luciano Odorisio) - Salvatore
 R.I.S. - Delitti imperfetti (2005, directed by Alexis Sweet) - Mauro Donati
 Il giudice Mastrangelo (2005, directed by Enrico Oldoini) - Procuratore De Cesare
 L'onore e il rispetto (2006-2009, directed by Salvatore Samperi) - Don Rosario Liberati
 Raccontami (2007) - Salvatore Lo Buono
 Io e mio figlio - Nuove storie per il commissario Vivaldi (2010) - Salvatore Girlando
 Squadra antimafia - Palermo oggi (2011, TV Series)
 Il segreto dell'acqua (2011, directed by Renato De Maria) - Salvatore Girlando
 Sangue caldo (2011, directed by Luigi Parisi, Alessio Inturri) - Vito Cirasola

References

External link

Italian male film actors
Italian male stage actors
Italian male television actors
Male actors from Palermo
Sicilian-speaking people
Ciak d'oro winners
1948 births
2017 deaths